Allogaster nigripennis is a species of beetle in the longhorn beetle family native to Sudan. 

Their larvae are known to drill into wood and cause damage to the live trees, or may burrow into trees that have been felled.

References 

Achrysonini
Beetles of Africa
Insects of Sudan
Endemic fauna of Sudan